Willam Hyde may refer to:

Politicians
William Hyde (high sheriff) (1490–1557), English politician
William Hyde (died 1403), MP, see City of London (elections to the Parliament of England)
William Hyde (fl.1407), MP for Lewes (UK Parliament constituency)
William Hyde (MP) (1635–1694), MP for Stamford (UK Parliament constituency)

Others
William Hyde (Douai) (1597–1651), president of the English College, Douai
William De Witt Hyde (1858–1917), American college president
William Hyde (journalist) (1836–1898), American journalist
William Hyde (Utah settler), a Mormon bishop and namesake of Hyde Park, Utah
William Hyde (artist), 1859–1925, British artist and printmaker

See also